This is a list of notable events in Latin music (i.e. music from the Spanish- and Portuguese-speaking areas Latin America, Latin Europe, and the United States) that took place in 2002.

Events 
September 18The 3rd Annual Latin Grammy Awards are held at the Kodak Theatre in Los Angeles.
Alejandro Sanz wins the Latin Grammy Awards for Song of the Year and Record of the Year for "Y Sólo Se Me Ocurre Amarte" and Album of the Year for MTV Unplugged.
Jorge Moreno wins Best New Artist.
Vicente Fernández is honored as the Latin Recording Academy Person of the Year.

Bands formed 
Arcuri Overthrow (Venezuela)
Asesino (Mexico)
Cali Philharmonic Orchestra (Colombia)
El Efecto (Brazil)
El Hombre Misterioso (Peru)
El Sueño de Morfeo (Spain)
Mambrú (Argentina)
Mercadonegro (Chile)
Trazendo a Arca (Brazil)
Tribalistas (Brazil)

Bands disbanded 
Flema (Argentina)
Mujeres Encinta (international)
Tijuana No! (Mexico)

Number-ones albums and singles by country 
List of number-one albums of 2002 (Spain)
List of number-one singles of 2002 (Spain)
List of number-one Billboard Top Latin Albums of 2002
List of number-one Billboard Hot Latin Tracks of 2002

Awards 
2002 Latin Grammy Awards
2002 Premio Lo Nuestro
2002 Billboard Latin Music Awards
2002 Tejano Music Awards

Albums released

First quarter

January

February

March

Second quarter

April

May

June

Third quarter

July

August

September

Fourth quarter

October

November

December

Unknown

Best-selling records

Best-selling albums
The following is a list of the top 10 best-selling Latin albums in the United States in 2002, according to Billboard.

Best-performing songs
The following is a list of the top 10 best-performing Latin songs in the United States in 2002, according to Billboard.

Births 
March 10 – Júlia Gomes, actress and singer
May 3 – MC Pedrinho, singer 
May 22 – Maisa Silva, singer, TV hostess and actress

Deaths 
 January 3 – Juan García Esquivel, 83, Mexican band leader, pianist and composer
 March 24 – Wilson Fonseca, Brazilian composer, conductor and writer
 June 5 – Carmelo Bernaola, 72, Spanish composer and clarinetist
 December 10 – El Carrao de Palmarito, 74, Venezuelan llanero singer

References 

 
Latin music by year